David Madden (born June 13, 1981) is an American game show contestant, academic competition organizer, and art historian. He is a former 19-day champion on Jeopardy! and holds the seventh-longest streak in Jeopardy history (tied with Jason Zuffranieri and behind only Ken Jennings, James Holzhauer, Julia Collins, Amy Schneider, and Matt Amodio in this respect). Madden is the founder and executive director of the National History Bee and Bowl, the International History Bee and Bowl, the United States Geography Championships, the US Academic Bee and Bowl, the National Science Bee, the National Humanities Bee, the National Political Science Bee, the International History Olympiad, and the International Geography Bee. These are all organized under the umbrella organization of International Academic Competitions.

Early life
During his time at Ridgewood High School in Ridgewood, New Jersey, Madden competed on his school's Quiz Bowl team, which he captained to a second place finish at the 1999 National Academic Championship. Madden attended Princeton University, graduating as a Woodrow Wilson School major in 2003. He attended the Free University of Berlin, receiving a master's degree in international relations.

Jeopardy!
Making his first appearance on the July 5, 2005 episode, Madden continued on a winning streak through September 19, winning a total of nineteen games and $432,400. His last appearance during non-tournament play was on September 19, when he was defeated by Victoria Groce, a musician from Decatur, Georgia, who later appeared as a panelist on The Chase. During the 2006 Tournament of Champions, Madden won his first-round match (defeating the eventual winner of the Tournament, Michael Falk), but failed to win his semifinal match, taking home a consolation prize of $10,000 and bringing his total to $442,400.

Madden first watched Jeopardy! with a babysitter when he was 11–12 years old. Madden would get the correct response to more clues than his babysitter. He claims to have studied a great deal in preparation for the show, which helped him with the clues. Madden's parents did not realize he was going to be on Jeopardy! until his first game aired.

Madden's streak of 19 wins in regular games was the second-longest in Jeopardy! history (after Jennings). He was later surpassed by  Julia Collins (20 wins in 2014), James Holzhauer (32, 2019), Matt Amodio (38, 2021), Amy Schneider (40, 2022) and Mattea Roach (23, 2022). Madden now has the seventh-longest Jeopardy! winning streak tied with Jason Zuffranieri. His total winnings in regular games, $432,400, were also the second-highest (after Jennings). Madden currently has the sixth-highest total winnings including tournament play.

Madden was invited to take part in 2014's Battle of the Decades Jeopardy! event but declined due to contractual issues. However, he was invited and was able to participate in the 2019 All-Star Games tournament featuring 18 past champions. Madden was selected as the seventh out of 12 picks in the All-Star Games Draft in September 2018, thus becoming a member of "Team Brad", led by the all-time Jeopardy winnings leader, Brad Rutter, along with his former Princeton University Quiz Bowl teammate, Larissa Kelly who was the sixth pick in the draft.

Team Brad won their first-round match and in the final episode, airing on March 5, 2019, Team Brad won the All-Star Games Tournament grand prize of $1,000,000, which was split between the three team members. After Madden's share of the prize, his all-time Jeopardy! earnings totaled $775,733.33.

Work as academic competition organizer
In 2010, Madden founded the National History Bee and Bowl, two academic quiz competitions for students with a history focus (the Bee is for individual students, the Bowl is for teams). He oversees all aspects of NHBB, and has expanded the competitions to include colleges and middle schools in the U.S., and high schools in over 20 foreign countries. The competitions outside the USA are known as the International History Bee and Bowl.

In 2012, Madden organized the National History Bee Middle School Competition, whose National Championships were filmed in May 2012 for broadcast on History.

Also in 2012, Madden founded the United States Geography Championships, which serves as the qualifying competition for students in the USA who are looking to attend the International Geography Olympiad. At the 2014 International Geography Olympiad, he served as head coach for the American team, which included the overall champion, James Mullen of Cupertino, California.

In 2015, Madden founded the International History Olympiad, which brought 111 students from 14 countries together for its inaugural competition, held at the College of William and Mary in Williamsburg, Virginia.

In 2016, Madden founded the US Academic Bee and Bowl, the National Science Bee, and the National Humanities Bee, all of which are currently directed at students in eighth grade and younger. The inaugural National Championships for all of these events was held in Arlington, Virginia, in May 2016.

In 2017, Madden founded the International Geography Bee as a worldwide geography quiz competition. The inaugural IGB World Championships were held in 2018 in Berlin in conjunction with the 3rd International History Olympiad.

Other work
Madden is a co-author of the 2010 catalogue raisonné of the American artist Richard Anuszkiewicz.

From July 2007 to February 2008, Madden hiked the length of the east coast of the United States as a fundraiser for the Fisher House Foundation, a charity that provides free accommodations for family members of veterans at American military hospitals.

Madden is an Ambassador for the Rainforest Alliance where he is establishing several initiatives related to environmental education, including the National Ecology and Environmental Science Exam in the USA and the International Environmental Science Olympiad, which will debut in Ecuador in 2023.

See also

 List of notable Jeopardy! contestants

References

External links
 Madden's personal blog detailing his hike

1981 births
Jeopardy! contestants
Living people
People from Ridgewood, New Jersey
Ridgewood High School (New Jersey) alumni
Princeton University alumni
Free University of Berlin alumni
American art historians
Historians from New Jersey